Yellow Jacket Pueblo is an Ancestral Puebloan archeological site located near Cortez, Colorado, in the Four Corners region of the Southwestern United States. With 1,200 rooms and 200 kivas spread across , it is the largest ancient pueblo in the Mesa Verde region.

References

Bibliography

Colorado Plateau
Ancestral Puebloans
Post-Archaic period in North America
Archaeological sites in Colorado
Native American history of Colorado